The Anguilla Progressive Movement is a political party in Anguilla. The party was named the Anguilla United Movement until being rebranded in 2019 alongside new leaders and colours.  Under various names, it was originally a vehicle for Ronald Webster and his supporters.

Electoral results

See also 
:Category:Anguilla Progressive Movement politicians

References

External links
Official website

Political parties in Anguilla
Liberal parties in British Overseas Territories
Liberal parties in North America
Centrist parties in North America